Highway 729 is a highway in the Canadian province of Saskatchewan. It runs from Highway 20 near Craven to Highway 640 near Edenwold.

See also 
Roads in Saskatchewan
Transportation in Saskatchewan

References 

729